Boalsburg Historic District is a national historic district located in the village of  Boalsburg in Harris Township Centre County, Pennsylvania.  The district includes 140 contributing buildings in the central business district and surrounding residential areas of Boalsburg.  The district is characterized by a predominance of Georgian and  Victorianized-Georgian buildings dated from 1803 to 1870. Notable non-residential buildings include the David Boal Tavern (1803), Wolf's Inn (1803-1832), and Boalsburg Tavern (1819). Located in the district is the separately listed Boal Mansion.

It was added to the National Register of Historic Places in 1977.

References

External links

Georgian architecture in Pennsylvania
Historic districts in Centre County, Pennsylvania
Historic districts on the National Register of Historic Places in Pennsylvania
National Register of Historic Places in Centre County, Pennsylvania